The Grand Canal with the Rialto Bridge from the South is a  painting by Francesco Guardi in the collection of the San Diego Museum of Art, in the U.S. state of California.

References

1775 paintings
Paintings in the collection of the San Diego Museum of Art